Privy is an old-fashioned term for an outdoor toilet, often known as an outhouse and by many other names. Privy may also refer to:
 Privy council, a body that advises the head of state
 Privy mark, a small mark in the design of a coin
 Privy Purse, the British sovereign's private income

See also
 Privity